The University of Prizren is a public university located in Prizren, Kosovo. It was originally established in 1962 as the High Pedagogical Institute (Shkolla e Lartë Pedagogjike - SHLP). It was re-established in 2010 under the present name. It offers bachelor degrees and master degrees in different fields.

History
University of Prizren is inherited from the High Pedagogical Institute which was established in 1962. The present form of the University started in 2010 with the decision number 01/87 -prizren.com/repository/docs/Self_evaluation_report__2016_444771.pdf#page=9|title=Mission and vision of UPZ|access-date=June 13, 2018}}</ref> Studies are mainly offered in the Albanian language. Minority languages Bosnian and Turkish are also offered in the Faculty of Education and Faculty of Computer Sciences.

Faculties and departments
 Faculty of Economics
 Business Administration
 International Management
 Accounting and Auditing
 Faculty of Law
 Law
 Faculty of Computer Science
 Information Technologies and Telecommunication
 Software Design
 Computer Science and Communication Technologies
 Faculty of Philology
 Albanian Language and Literature
 English Language and Literature
 German Language and Literature
 Faculty of Education
 Primary Education
 Preschool Education
 Faculty of Life and Environmental Sciences
 Forest and Environmental Sciences
 Agribusiness
 Agribusiness Management

See also 
 Education in Prizren
 University of Pristina
 Monumental Complex of the Albanian League of Prizren

Notes

References

 Self Evaluation Report (in Albanian)
 Self Evaluation Report (in English)
 Quality Assurance and Enhancement Strategy of the University of Prizren

Prizren
Buildings and structures in Prizren
Education in Prizren
Educational institutions established in 1962
1962 establishments in Kosovo
Kosovan culture